Khaled Mohamad al-Asaad (January 1932 – 18 August 2015) was a Syrian archaeologist and the head of antiquities at the ancient city of Palmyra, a UNESCO World Heritage Site. He held this position for over forty years. Al-Asaad was publicly beheaded by the Islamic State of Iraq and Syria (ISIS) on 18 August 2015, at the age of eighty-three.

Early life, education, and family
Al-Asaad was born in 1932 in Palmyra, where he spent most of his life. He held a diploma in history and was educated at the University of Damascus. Al-Asaad was the father of six sons and five daughters, one of whom was named Zenobia after the well-known Palmyrene queen.

Career

Archaeologist
During his career, Al-Asaad engaged in the excavations and restoration of Palmyra. He became the principal custodian of the Palmyra site in 1963, a position he held for forty years. His own expeditions focused on the late third-century ramparts of Palmyra. , and worked with American, Polish, German, French, and Swiss archaeological missions. His achievement is the elevation of Palmyra to a UNESCO World Heritage Site. He was also fluent in Aramaic and regularly translated texts until 2011.

From 1974 onward, Al-Asaad organised exhibitions of Palmyran antiques.

When he retired in 2003, his son Walid took over his work at Palmyra. They both were reportedly detained by ISIS in August 2015 – Walid survived.

Politics
It is believed that he joined the Syrian Ba'ath Party around 1954. However, it is unclear whether he was an active supporter of the Syrian government of Bashar al-Assad. According to The Economist, some have claimed he was a "staunch supporter" of Assad.

Death

In May 2015, Tadmur (the modern city of Palmyra) and the adjacent ancient city of Palmyra came under the control of the Islamic State of Iraq and Syria (ISIS).

Al-Asaad helped evacuate the city museum prior to ISIS's takeover, but was himself captured by the terrorist organisation. ISIS then tortured Al-Asaad in an attempt to discover the location of the ancient artefacts that he helped hide. He was murdered in Tadmur on 18 August 2015 at the age of eighty-three.

The New York Times reported:After detaining him for weeks, the jihadists dragged him on Tuesday to a public square where a masked swordsman cut off his head in front of a crowd, Mr. Asaad's relatives said. His blood-soaked body was then suspended with red twine by its wrists from a traffic light, his head resting on the ground between his feet, his glasses still on, according to a photo distributed on social media by Islamic State supporters.

Following al-Asaad's death, ISIS hanged a placard on his corpse listing his alleged "crimes": being an "apostate", representing Syria at "infidel conferences", serving as "the director of idolatry" in Palmyra, visiting "Heretic Iran", and communicating with "a brother in the Syrian security services".

His body was reportedly displayed in the new section of Palmyra (Tadmur) and then in the ancient section, the treasures of which ISIS had already demolished.

In February 2021, Syrian state sources reported the discovery of al-Asaad's body in the countryside 10km east of Palmyra.

Along with al-Asaad, Qassem Abdullah Yehya, the Deputy Director of the DGAM Laboratories, also protected the Palmyra site, and was murdered by ISIS while on duty on 12 August 2015. He was thirty-seven years old.

Reactions
The Chief of Syrian Antiquities, Maamoun Abdulkarim, condemned al-Asaad's death, calling him "a scholar who gave such memorable services to the place Palmyra and to history". He called al-Asaad's ISIL killers a "bad omen on Palmyra".
 Dario Franceschini, the Italian Minister of Cultural Heritage and Activities and Tourism, announced that the flags of all Italian museums would be flown at half-mast in honor of al-Asaad.
UNESCO and its general director Irina Bokova condemned al-Asaad's murder, saying "They killed him because he would not betray his deep commitment to Palmyra. Here is where he dedicated his life."
The United Kingdom and France released statements condemning the murder and destruction at Palmyra.
The Aligarh Historians Society said: "Civilized people, irrespective of country or religion, must unite in their support for all political and military measures designed to achieve this end, especially those being made by the governments of Syria and Iraq."
Persian-American poet Kaveh Akbar published the poem "Palmyra" in response to al-Asaad's death. The poem's dedication reads "after Khaled al-Asaad".

Honours and medals

Syrian honors
 Order of Civil Merit (2015) - Awarded posthumously

Foreign honors
  Poland – Order of Merit of the Republic of Poland (1998)

  Italy – On 17 October 2015, the President of Italy inaugurated the rehabilitated Arsenali della Repubblica in Pisa which was renamed after al-Asaad.

Film
 A 2019 film titled Dam al Nakhl (The Blood of Palm) portrays al-Asaad's brave resistance against ISIS.

Selected publications
; 2nd edition 1990.

 Asaad, Khaled; Yon, Jean-Baptiste (2001), Inscriptions de Palmyre. Promenades épigraphiques dans la ville antique de Palmyre (= Guides archéologiques de l'Institut Français d'Archéologie du Proche-Orient Bd. 3). Institut Français d'Archéologie du Proche-Orient, Beirut 2001; .
 Asaad, Khaled; Schmidt-Colinet, Andreas (eds) (2013), Palmyras Reichtum durch weltweiten Handel. Archäologische Untersuchungen im Bereich der hellenistischen Stadt. 2 vols.

See also

Destruction of cultural heritage by ISIL
Syrian Archaeological Heritage Under Threat
Syro-Palestinian archaeology
Virtual visit of Palmyra dedicated to Khaled al-Asaad

References

1932 births
2015 deaths
20th-century archaeologists
21st-century archaeologists
Archaeologists of the Near East
Damascus University alumni
People beheaded by the Islamic State of Iraq and the Levant
People from Homs Governorate
Recipients of the Order of Merit of the Republic of Poland
Syrian archaeologists